Alick Gladstone Lill (10 May 1904 – 31 December 1987) was an Australian rules footballer who played with Norwood in the SANFL.

Football
Debuting in 1923, Lill was a tall centreman and was a member of three premiership sides at Norwood. He won the club's Best and Fairest award in 1924, 1925 and 1927. In 1925 he also won a Magarey Medal and from 1925 to 1930 he was a regular South Australian representative at interstate football, appearing in a total of 20 games. After 123 games for Norwood, Lill retired in 1931 due to constant knee injuries and later served as Norwood's coach for a brief period.

Lill's son John had a noted South Australian sporting career.

He worked at the state bank of South Australia, as a branch manager.

See also
 1927 Melbourne Carnival

Footnotes

External links

Alick Lill's profile at the Norwood Football Club

1904 births
Australian rules footballers from South Australia
Norwood Football Club players
Norwood Football Club coaches
Magarey Medal winners
South Australian Football Hall of Fame inductees
1987 deaths